The 2013 Brazilian protests. were public demonstrations in several Brazilian cities, initiated mainly by the Movimento Passe Livre (Free Fare Movement), a local entity that advocates for free public transportation.

The demonstrations were initially organized to protest against increases in bus, train, and metro ticket prices in some Brazilian cities, but grew to include other issues such as the high corruption in the government and police brutality used against some demonstrators. By mid-June, the movement had grown to become Brazil's largest since the 1992 protests against former President Fernando Collor de Mello.

As with the 2013 Gezi Park protests in Turkey, social media has played an important role in the organization of public outcries and in keeping protesters in touch with one another.

Name 

Urban riots in Brazil have been traditionally been referred to as the 'Revolt of [Something]'. An example of this was Rio de Janeiro's Revolta da Vacina in the early 20th century.

Piero Locatelli, a journalist for the CartaCapital magazine, was arrested and taken to the Civil Police after being found with a bottle of vinegar. The sarcastic tone dubbing the protests  i.e. "the vinegar march", was a reference to the popularity of an earlier grassroots march for legalizing marijuana named Marcha da Maconha (the Brazilian version of the Global Marijuana March).

(meaning "Spring") is also being used by media.

The alternative name "June Journeys" (Jornadas de Junho), used by some sources and adapted from the France use of journées (days) in the sense of an important event, traces a revolutionary pedigree going back to the June Days Uprising, the June 1848 French workers' uprising in the wake of the 1848 Revolution in France.

Background 

The first demonstrations took place in Natal, Rio Grande do Norte, during August–September 2012 and were informally called  or Bus Rebellion. Over the course of these protests, demonstrators convinced their municipal authority to reduce the fare price. Similar protests were carried out in Porto Alegre in March 2013, where protesters tried to convince the local city hall to further reduce the fare price, after it had been reduced by a judicial decision.

In Goiânia, demonstrations started on May 16, before the prices were officially raised on May 22 from R$2.70 to R$3.00. The peak of those demonstrations was on May 28, at Bíblia Square, when four buses were destroyed; two were incinerated and two were stoned. 24 students were arrested for vandalism and disobedience. Another demonstration took place on June 6, when students closed streets in downtown Goiânia, set fire to car tires, threw homemade bombs, and broke windows of police cars. On June 13, the fares were brought back to their previous price when judge Fernando de Mello Xavier issued a preliminary injunction arguing that local bus companies were exempted from paying some taxes as of June 1, but the passengers were not benefiting from this exemption.

In São Paulo, demonstrations started when the municipal government and the government of the State of São Paulo, which runs the train and metro system of São Paulo, announced the rise of ticket prices from R$3.00 to R$3.20. The previous hike of bus fares occurred in January 2011, and was also subject of demonstrations. Train and metro fares had been raised to the same price in February 2012. In early 2013, immediately after his election, Mayor  Fernando Haddad announced that fares would increase in early 2013. In May, the federal government announced that public transportation would be exempted from paying PIS and COFINS, two taxes of Brazil, so that the increase of public transportation costs would not contribute to ongoing inflation. Even so, the fares were raised from R$3.00 to R$3.20, starting on June 2, sparking demonstrations.

Demands of protesters 
Although the bus fare increase was the tipping point for demonstrators, the basis for public disenchantment with the policies of the ruling class went far deeper. There was frustration among the general population's disappointment with the inadequate provision of social services in Brazil. Despite Brazil's international recognition in lifting 40 million out of poverty, and into the nova Classe C with comfortable access to a middle class consumer market, the policies have been the subject of intense political debate. Groups among the protestors argues that "Bolsa Familia" and other social policies were simply an electoral strategy from the Worker's Party aimed at "alming the poor". Political opponents took issue with neoliberal or post-neoliberal traitor of its original Marxist precepts that benefits mostly the old, corrupt and stereotypical elites with black money and shady methods, and only making the life of the traditional, more conservative, middle middle and upper middle classes (that are rejected as a sign of reactionary decadence by left-wing elements, and dominant among the mostly urban, young, white, and educated protesters) even harder while political scandals involving the public money most expensive to this conservative middle class run rampant.

Meanwhile, mega sports projects such as the 2013 FIFA Confederations Cup and the 2014 FIFA World Cup (to which at that time Brazil had already spent over 7 billion reais and with total expected cost of over 32 billion reais, equivalent to three times South Africa's total in 2010, despite only half the stadiums being finished), as well as the 2016 Summer Olympics, have turned out to be over-budget, and have resulted in a series of revelations about gross overbillings and multibillion-dollar financial scandals. The occurrence of these protests simultaneously with Confederations Cup matches, with sounds of police weapons being audible during the Uruguay vs. Nigeria match on Thursday June 20, have raised serious questions amongst other sporting nations about the capability of Brazil to host the main event in a year's time, based upon its ostensibly severe social problems. Other points of discontent are the high inflation rates and increases in the prices of basic consumer goods, including food, that, as many other things in Brazil, are heavily taxed (at 27%).

Other commonly stated reasons for the malaise include high taxes that do not benefit the poor. The average Brazilian citizen is estimated to pay 40.5% of their income in taxes, yet the country still suffers from various social and infrastructural problems such as poorly functioning health services, a low education rate, inadequate welfare benefits, and a growing but still low rate of employment.

There is also a feeling of powerlessness due to widespread cases of corruption and embezzlement as well as a lack of transparency and financial accountability. Indicted leaders and politicians often stay in power despite being cited for corruption and collusion in the growing overbilling scandals. The protesters particularly object to a constitutional amendment currently being drafted known as PEC 37 that is seen as a cover-up for corrupt politicians and an attempt to reduce the power of the judiciary in pursuing cases. Though not a main cause for the demonstrations, some protestors also object to socially conservative legislation by the religious benches that is seen as a retrocess to Brazil's LGBT and women's rights, a threat to the state of Brazilian secularism, and even freedom of expression.

Timeline

June 1 to 14

In June 2013, a series of protests in the Brazilian city of São Paulo were organized against bus and metro fare hikes announced by the city mayor Fernando Haddad in January 2013, who stated that the fares would rise from  R$ 3.00 to R$3.20, coming into effect on June 1.

The first large protest was held on June 6 on Paulista Avenue. In ensuing protests, news reports changed the discourse, mentioning that police had "lost control" on June 13, because they began using rubber bullets not only against protesters but also journalists that were covering the events. Numerous civil rights groups have criticized the harsh police response, including Amnesty International and the Associação Nacional de Jornais.

June 17 to 18
An estimated 250,000 protesters took to the streets of various cities on June 17. The largest protests were organized in Rio de Janeiro, where 100,000 attended from mid-afternoon of June 17 to late dawn of June 18.

Although mostly peaceful, the protests escalated with the invasion of the State's Legislative Chamber, causing riot police to be called in. Three protesters were injured by gunfire, reportedly by police forces, while ten others were hospitalized.

State government authorities did not intervene, saying this was an issue for the Military Police. Other protests erupted in support of those being detained by police. Demonstrations were held in a number of cities. The ones held in Curitiba were reported attended by over 10,000 people.

Minor protests staged by Brazilians living abroad were held in several countries including Argentina, Australia, Canada, Germany, Ireland, Italy, Portugal, Spain, the United Kingdom and the United States.

June 19

Protests continued on a smaller scale. Mayors of several Brazilian cities announced reduction of bus fares or cancellation of previously announced increases, including Rio de Janeiro and São Paulo, where the largest protests had occurred.

June 20
Protests in over 100 cities around the country rallied over 2 million people. Special measures were taken to protect main government buildings on major cities like the federal capital Brasília, Rio de Janeiro, São Paulo, Manaus, Belém, Recife, Florianópolis, Belo Horizonte, Goiânia, Curitiba and Porto Alegre, among others.
Rafael Braga was arrested, who later received the only conviction of charges related to the 2013 protests in Brazil.

June 21 to 23

Protests across Brazil have drawn millions to the streets in a wave of rolling fury that became the biggest demonstrations in decades. A young man was killed in Ribeirão Preto during the protest when a driver ploughed through a peaceful demonstration, also injuring 11 other people. President Dilma Rousseff addressed the nation, recognizing the demands of the protesters and calling a meeting of state governors and mayors of key cities to discuss the requests of the population and propose solutions to solve the issues.

June 24
As protests continue on a smaller scale, President Dilma Rousseff along the 27 state governors and the mayors of the 26 state capitals, among other authorities, agree to take measures related to improve funds management, public transport, health care and education. Also announced is a proposal for congress to approve a referendum on widespread political reform.

June 25
Almost all members of National Chamber reject controversial law limiting the powers of the Public Ministry to investigate criminal activities in the government, thus accomplishing one of the demands of the protests. President Dilma Rousseff announces that plans for a special constituent assembly on political reform were abandoned, but there are still plans to submit the constitutional amendments in discussion to popular vote.

June 26

Almost all members of National Chamber approved the destination of petroleum royalties to education (75%) and health (25%). The congress also approved the end of secret vote for forfeiture of office and the recognition of all forms of corruption and embezzlement as heinous crimes; and the end of all Taxes regarding Public transport, including metro, train, bus and ship. A large protest of 120.000 people is held in Belo Horizonte where the 2013 Confederations Cup semifinal match between Brazil and Uruguay was occurring, and ran with no incidents until small riots began. A young man died after falling from a viaduct.

June 30
Protesters in Brazil clashed with police during the Confederations Cup final match between the host nation and Spain in Rio de Janeiro. Earlier that day, a group of demonstrators tried to storm a Brazilian Football Confederation (CBF) building in Rio. Police kept them back and the group settled outside the building. In a separate protest, several thousand people marched on the Maracanã stadium banging drums.

The protesters demanded free public transport, carrying placards reading "FIFA - you pay the bill". The demonstrators also called for an end to corruption and the resignation of the Rio State governor.

July 2

The "Gay cure" Bill, PDL 234, which would have authorized psychologists to treat LGBT people was voted down by the National Congress. In 1830, eight years after the end of Portuguese colonial rule, sodomy laws were eliminated from the new Penal Code of Brazil. Since 1985 the Federal Council of Medicine of Brazil has not considered homosexuality as deviant. In 1999, the Federal Council of Psychology published a resolution that has standardized the conduct of psychologists to face this norm: "...[regulated] psychologists should not collaborate with events or services proposing treatment and cure of homosexuality." In 1990, five years after Brazil removed homosexuality from its list of mental illnesses, the General Assembly of the World Health Organization (WHO), with headquarters in Geneva, Switzerland, removed homosexuality from the International Classification of Diseases (ICD).

PDL 234 dealt only with lesbian, gay, and bisexual persons, as Brazil still pathologizes transgender people. Doctors do not allow hormone therapy for transgender people before age 16, allow gender reassignment surgery for those who have "normal or healthy" genital conditions other than third party-confirmed trans people above the age of 18, and does not ban sexual assignment surgery for intersex newborns and young children. Doctors with parental consent may alter a child's ambiguous genitals without his/her consent and much before gender behavioral characteristics and/or identification would naturally appear.

July 5
In Seattle Justin Jasper, an armed local was arrested for planning action in support of Brazil protesters.

Later demonstrations
Although smaller than the June demonstrations, another wave of protests occurred in many cities around Brazil on September 7. Protesters organized to challenge military parades that were celebrating Brazil's 1822 independence from Portugal. There were also demonstrations to question government spending on World Cup stadiums and government corruption.

Responses
Following a pledge by President Dilma Rousseff to spend 50 billion Brazilian reais on improving urban public transportation after a meeting with protest leaders June 24, the Brazilian real fell on concern of a widening deficit. This followed a nearly 10 percent fall in the currency in the second quarter of 2013, the worst amongst 16 major currencies.

International reactions

State
  Turkish Prime Minister Recep Tayyip Erdoğan linked the protests with similar protests in Turkey, claiming that they were part of a conspiracy by unspecified foreign forces, bankers, and international and local media outlets. He said that "the same game is now being played over Brazil. The symbols are the same, the posters are the same, Twitter, Facebook are the same, the international media is the same. They are being led from the same center. They are doing their best to achieve in Brazil what they could not achieve in Turkey." He further stated that the two protests were "the same game, the same trap, the same aim."

See also 
 List of protests in the 21st century
 2000 Costa Rican Revolution
 2021 Brazilian protests
 List of scandals in Brazil

Notes

References

Further reading

External links

 A 360° Virtual Tour during protests at Sao Jose do Rio Preto Streets
 Brazil Protests - A rough guide Blog
 Public Demand - Brazilian protests and music Podcast
 The Brazilian Protests of June 2013: an economist's view (Slideshare Presentation)

2013 in Brazil
2013 protests
Protests in Brazil
Protests
Protests
Sports riots
2013 riots
Articles containing video clips
Pricing controversies
April 2013 events in South America
May 2013 events in South America